Recep Uslu is a Turkish writer and researcher on Turkish musicology.

Biography

Bibliography
His some books and articles:
 [1. Mehmed Hafid Efendi and Music (2001),]
 [2. Musicians in the Ottoman and Central Asia in the 15th Century According to an unknown work, in The Great Ottoman Turkish Civilization, Ankara 2000, vol. IV, pp. 548–555]
 [3. Music in Fatih Era, in Atlas of Turkish culture, Istanbul 2002]
 [4. Musicology and his sources in Turkey (2006),]
 [5. Mehmet II and music in his court (2007),] 
 [6. Ruhperver, Istanbul 2009, with Sureyya Agayeva]
 [7. A Violanist in the Ottoman Court, Istanbul 2010]

References
http://konservatuvar.gazi.edu.tr/posts/view/title/yrd.-doc.-dr.-recep-uslu-27893
http://akademi.itu.edu.tr/uslure/
http://www.turkcebilgi.com/ansiklopedi/recep_uslu

Turkish musicologists
1958 births
Writers from Istanbul
Living people